Owen Slot is a British sports journalist and author. He is Chief Rugby Correspondent for The Times.

In addition to his own works he was ghostwriter for Jonny, the autobiography of Jonny Wilkinson.

Publications
 The Finishing Line (2004) Hodder & Stoughton, 
 The Proposal (2005) Hodder & Stoughton,  
 Cycling for Gold (2012) Puffin Books, 
 Running for Gold (2012) Puffin Books, 
 The Talent Lab: How to Turn Potential into World-Beating Success (2016) Ebury Press,

References

Living people
British sportswriters
The Times people
Year of birth missing (living people)